The 2011–12 Welsh Football League Division Three began on 16 August 2011 and ended on 16 May 2012.

Team changes from 2010–11
Bridgend Street were promoted from the South Wales Senior League and Undy Athletic were promoted from the Gwent County League.

Cwmamman United were relegated to the Neath & District League. Cwmbrân Town were relegated to the Gwent County League. South Gower were relegated to the Swansea Senior League. Porthcawl Town Athletic were relegated to the South Wales Senior League.

Caerau, Monmouth Town and Tata Steel were promoted to the Welsh Football League Division Two.

AFC Llwydcoed, Abertillery Bluebirds and Llangeinor were relegated from the Welsh Football League Division Two.

Llangeinor withdrew from the league in December.

League table

Results

References

External links
 Welsh Football League

Welsh Football League Division Three seasons
4
Wales